Eskilsminne IF is a Swedish football club located in Helsingborg in Skåne County. Currently playing in Division 1 Södra, the third tier in the Swedish football league system. 

Eskilsminnes team colours today are yellow and blue striped, which is an "inheritance" from Stattena who played in the best tier Allsvenskan, with derbies against Helsingborgs IF. But the original club colours are light and dark purple-striped shirt and white shorts.

Background
Eskilsminne Idrottsförening is a football club from the district of Eskilsminne in Helsingborg that was founded on 18 May 1928. The club runs around 50 teams and has between 1200 and 1300 members, which is the largest youth organisation in Scania. Since 1968 the club has organised on an annual basis the Eskilscupen, which is one of the oldest and largest tournaments in youth football. The club also provides an annual football school for children between five and eight years, with an emphasis on fun and fellowship. Eskilsminne IF received the 2005 award for "Best sports for children and youth" from the Skånska idrottsförbundet (Scanian Sports Association).

Since their foundation Eskilsminne IF has participated mainly in the middle and lower divisions of the Swedish football league system.  The club currently plays in Division 2 Västra Götaland which is the fourth tier of Swedish football. They play their home matches at the Harlyckans IP in Helsingborg.

Eskilsminne IF are affiliated to Skånes Fotbollförbund.

Recent history

In recent seasons Eskilsminne IF have competed in the following divisions:

1999 – Division 5 Skåne Nordvästra
2000 – Division 5 Skåne Västra
2001 – Division 6 Skåne Nordvästra A
2002 – Division 5 Skåne Nordvästra
2003 – Division 5 Skåne nordvästra B
2004 – Division 5 Skåne nordvästra A
2005 – Division 5 Skåne nordvästra
2006 – Division 5 Skåne västra
2007 – Division 5 Skåne nordvästra
2008 – Division 5 Skåne västra
2009 – Division 4 Skåne västra
2010 – Division 3 sydvästra Götaland
2011 – Division 3 sydvästra Götaland
2012 – Division 2 Södra Götaland
2013 – Division 2 Västra Götaland
2014 – Division 2 Västra Götaland
2015 – Division 1 Södra
2016 – Division 2 Västra Götaland
2017 – Division 2 Västra Götaland
2018 – Division 1 Södra
2019 – Division 1 Södra
2020 – Division 1 Södra

Attendances

In recent seasons Eskilsminne IF have had the following average attendances:

Footnotes

External links
 Eskilsminne IF – Official website
 Eskilsminne IF on Facebook
 Eskilscupen – Youth tournament website
  Eskilsminne IF (Eskilscupen) on Twitter

Football clubs in Skåne County
Football in Helsingborg
Association football clubs established in 1928
1928 establishments in Sweden